Asās al-Taqdīs, also known as Ta'sis al-Taqdis is an Islamic theological book, written by the Shafi'i-Ash'ari scholar Fakhr al-Din al-Razi (d. 606/1209), as a methodical refutation of the Karramiyya and other anthropomorphists.

Fakhr al-Din al-Razi wrote this work to counter the book Kitab al-Tawhid composed by the traditionalist Ibn Khuzayma in 4th/10th century Nisapur against the prevailing Mu'tazilite dogma. He referred to Ibn Khuzayma as 'the corporealist' (al-mujassim).

He said in the book's introduction that he dedicated it especially to the Sultan Abu Bakr ibn Ayyub.

Content 
The first part of the book opens with a categorical rejection of any corporeality regarding God, under the title of "Indications on God's Transcendence beyond Corporeality and on Him not Being Confined [by any spatial location]". That is, in fact, his definition of anthropomorphism: al-Razi maintains that the one God is not present in a direction; He is not a space-occupying entity and is not a body, an assertion for which he provides proofs based on rational and textual evidence. 

Al-Razi raises numerous claims, which he then refutes. The claims he contradicts are namely those held by the corporealist Karramites and the ultra-traditionalists who affirmed God's direction (jiha) and its veridical meaning (as haqiqa: truth, reality). In his discussion al-Razi articulates the Mu'tazilite stance on this matter and explains the proper figurative interpretation (ta'wil), according to his opinion.

Criticism 
Ibn Taymiyya (d. 728/1328) and his student Ibn al-Qayyim (d. 751/1350) criticized and attacked it. Ibn Taymiyya attacked it in a book entitled al-Ta'sis fi Radd Asas al-Taqdis, better known as Bayan Talbis al-Jahmiyya.

See also 
 Al-Baz al-Ashhab
 Al-Sayf al-Saqil fi al-Radd ala Ibn Zafil
 The Moderation in Belief
 A Guide to Conclusive Proofs for the Principles of Belief
 List of Sunni books

References

External links 
 Book's page on Goodreads — Goodreads.com

Books by Fakhr al-Din al-Razi
Books about anthropomorphism in Islamic theology
Sunni literature
Ash'ari literature
Kalam
Islamic theology books
Islamic belief and doctrine
12th-century Arabic books